Phongset is a Loloish language of Phongsaly Province, northern Laos.

In Phongsaly Province, Laos, Phongset is spoken in Phongset village, Bun Neua District (Shintani 2001).

References

Shintani, Tadahiko, Ryuichi Kosaka, and Takashi Kato. 2001. Linguistic Survey of Phongxaly, Lao P.D.R. Tokyo: Institute for the Study of Languages and Cultures of Asia and Africa (ILCAA).
Wright, Pamela Sue. n.d. Singsali (Phunoi) Speech Varieties Of Phongsali Province. m.s.

Southern Loloish languages
Languages of Laos